Onkapringa may refer to.

Onkaparinga Football Club, a predecessor of  the Onkaparinga Valley Football Club
Onkaparinga Racecourse - now called the  Oakbank Racecourse
Onkaparinga Racing Club  - now called the  Oakbank Racing Club
District Council of Onkaparinga, a former local government area in South Australia
Onkaparinga River, a river in South Australia
Onkaparinga Rugby Union Football Club
City of Onkaparinga, a local government area in South Australia
Electoral district of Onkaparinga, a former electorate district in South Australia
Hundred of Onkaparinga, a cadastral unit in South Australia

See also

Onkaparinga Hills, South Australia
Onkaparinga Valley Road